Marijn de Vries (born 19 November 1978) is a Dutch journalist and former racing cyclist. De Vries took up bicycle racing in 2008 whilst working as a reporter for the Dutch TV programme . She subsequently attempted to turn professional as part of a radio documentary she made, leading to her joining Leontien van Moorsel's Leontien.nl team in 2010. She competed in the 2013 UCI women's team time trial in Florence.

On 30 August 2015, de Vries announced her retirement from professional cycling.

Major results

2010
 9th Holland Hills Classic
2012
 5th Chrono des Nations
 7th Gooik–Geraardsbergen–Gooik
2013
 8th Ronde van Drenthe World Cup

See also
 2011 AA Drink–leontien.nl season
 2012 AA Drink–leontien.nl season
 2014 Team Giant–Shimano season

References

External links
 

1978 births
Living people
Dutch female cyclists
Dutch journalists
People from Coevorden
Cyclists from Drenthe